Ali Hassan Yaakoub (born 26 January 1985) is a Lebanese footballer who plays as a midfielder for  club Mabarra.

Career statistics

International 
Scores and results list Lebanon's goal tally first, score column indicates score after each Yaakoub goal.

References

External links
 
 
 
 

1985 births
Living people
People from Baalbek District
Lebanese footballers
Association football midfielders
Al Ahed FC players
Nejmeh SC players
Al Mabarra Club players
Al Nabi Chit SC players
Lebanese Premier League players
Lebanese Second Division players
Lebanon youth international footballers
Lebanon international footballers